Korigad (also called Koraigad, Koarigad or Kumwarigad) is a hill fort located about  south of Lonavla in Pune district, Maharashtra, India. Its date of construction is not known but likely predates 1500. It is about 923 m above sea level. The planned township of Aamby Valley is built over the fort's southern and eastern foothills.

History
This fort was incorporated into his kingdom by the Maratha ruler Chatrapati Shivaji Maharaj along with the forts of Lohagad, Visapur, Tung and Tikona in 1657. On 11 March 1818, Colonel Prother tried to take over this fort but even after a prolonged siege could not make any headway. Finally on 14 March, by igniting the stored ammunition by means of a loose cannonball he succeeded and this fort went to the British.

Geography
To the east, there lie two artificial lakes part of the Aamby Valley project which later drain into the Mulshi reservoir. There are two lakes on the top of the fort.

Structures on the Fort
A temple to its patron goddess Koraidevi also exists along with several smaller temples dedicated to Vishnu and Shiva. The former has been recently renovated and has a 3-foot-high Deepmala(tower of lamps). The interesting part of the fort is that its wall is completely intact and one can walk along its entire perimeter(about 2 km). Its massive gate is also intact. Several ruins of older structures within the fort still exist. It has six cannons - the largest of which called the Laxmi Toph is located near the Korai Devi temple.

How to reach

To reach Korigad you should have your own vehicle as there are very few transportation options available from Lonavla. Take the Aamby Valley road from Lonavla, keep driving till Peth Shahpur village. Parking is provided near the bus stop on the road. A 5-foot wide earthen road leads to the foot steps of the Korigad fort. It is an easy climb up to the fort. You can also hire cabs from Lonavala. The Aamby Valley buses from Lonavala bus station are also available. This fort can be visited in any time of the year. Even a night trek during summer gives nice experience. There are lot of camping sites on the fort. There are three temples on the fort which provide ample cover. The Korai Devi temple can accommodate 25 persons.

References 
Korigad Trek info

Forts in Pune district
Lonavala-Khandala
Buildings and structures in Lonavala-Khandala